The 2017 Thailand Masters Grand Prix Gold was the third Grand Prix's badminton tournament of the 2017 BWF Grand Prix Gold and Grand Prix. The tournament was held at the Nimibutr Stadium in Bangkok, Thailand on February 7–12, 2017 and had a total purse of $120,000.

Men's singles

Seeds

  Tanongsak Saensomboonsuk (quarterfinals)
  Huang Yuxiang (third round)
  Tommy Sugiarto (champion)
  Jonatan Christie (second round)
  Qiao Bin (withdrew)
  Sony Dwi Kuncoro (withdrew)
  Hsu Jen-hao (third round)
  Sameer Verma (first round)
  Ihsan Maulana Mustofa (third round)
  Anthony Sinisuka Ginting (semifinals)
  Sourabh Varma (first round)
  Liew Daren (withdrew)
  Zhao Junpeng (quarterfinals)
  Parupalli Kashyap (withdrew)
  Khosit Phetpradab (quarterfinals)
  Firman Abdul Kholik (third round)

Finals

Top half

Section 1

Section 2

Section 3

Section 4

Bottom half

Section 5

Section 6

Section 7

Section 8

Women's singles

Seeds

  Busanan Ongbamrungphan (champion)
  Nitchaon Jindapol (semifinals)
  Chen Yufei (semifinals)
  Aya Ohori (final)
  Liang Xiaoyu (quarterfinals)
  Soniia Cheah (quarterfinals)
  Pornpawee Chochuwong (second round)
  Chen Xiaoxin (quarterfinals)

Finals

Top half

Section 1

Section 2

Bottom half

Section 3

Section 4

Men's doubles

Seeds

  Bodin Issara / Nipitphon Puangpuapech (withdrew)
  Fajar Alfian / Muhammad Rian Ardianto (quarterfinals)
  Kittinupong Kedren / Dechapol Puavaranukroh (semifinals)
  Hoon Thien How / Teo Kok Siang (second round)
  Hendra Setiawan /  Tan Boon Heong (second round)
  Huang Kaixiang / Wang Yilu (champion)
  Wahyu Nayaka / Ade Yusuf (second round)
  Chooi Kah Ming / Low Juan Shen (quarterfinals)

Finals

Top half

Section 1

Section 2

Bottom half

Section 3

Section 4

Women's doubles

Seeds

  Chen Qingchen / Jia Yifan (champion)
  Puttita Supajirakul / Sapsiree Taerattanachai (final)
  Jongkolphan Kititharakul / Rawinda Prajongjai (first round)
  Anggia Shitta Awanda / Ni Ketut Mahadewi Istirani (quarterfinals)
  Huang Dongping / Li Yinhui (semifinals)
  Greysia Polii / Rosyita Eka Putri Sari  (semifinals)
  Tiara Rosalia Nuraidah / Rizki Amelia Pradipta (quarterfinals)
  Della Destiara Haris / Apriani Rahayu (quarterfinals)

Finals

Top half

Section 1

Section 2

Bottom half

Section 3

Section 4

Mixed doubles

Seeds

  Bodin Isara / Savitree Amitrapai (withdrew)
  Dechapol Puavaranukroh / Sapsiree Taerattanachai (final)
  Ronald Alexander / Melati Daeva Oktavianti (second round)
  Terry Hee Yong Kai / Tan Wei Han (semifinals)
  Zhang Nan / Li Yinhui (champion)
  Tontowi Ahmad / Gloria Emanuelle Widjaja (withdrew)
  Alfian Eko Prasetya / Annisa Saufika (semifinals)
  Nipitphon Puangpuapech / Jongkolphan Kititharakul (first round)

Finals

Top half

Section 1

Section 2

Bottom half

Section 3

Section 4

References

External links 
 Tournament Link

Thailand Masters
Thailand Masters Grand Prix Gold
Badminton, Grand Prix Gold, Thailand Masters
Badminton, Grand Prix Gold, Thailand Masters
Thailand Masters (badminton)
Badminton, Grand Prix Gold, Thailand Masters